Maluso, officially the Municipality of Maluso (Tausūg: Dai'rah Lupah Maluso; Chavacano: Municipalidad de Maluso), is a 4th class municipality in the province of Basilan, Philippines. According to the 2020 census, it has a population of 45,730 people.

It is geographically situated in the Province of Basilan, on the southwestern part of the island, in close vicinity to Sulu group and Banguingui Isles, making it the third most populous town after Isabela City and Lamitan City, in terms of people living in semi-urban areas. Maluso has beautiful beaches, rivers and dynamic mangrove areas, and also home to different ethnolinguistic tribes such as Yakan, Iranun, Banguingui and Tausug, peaceably living with kolono groups from different parts of Luzon and Visayas who migrated during the commonwealth era, mostly settled permanently later on. Maluso is one of the core member of Western Basilan Alliance, a group of five municipalities consisted of Maluso, Hji. Muhtamad, Lantawan, Sumisip and Tabuan-Lasa LGUs, sponsored and capacitated by the Spanish government aid agency AECID-funded "MILAB 2" Project, in partnership with the Provincial Government of Basilan.

On July 1, 2022, it launched its own Flagship program dubbed as “Marayaw Maluso: Peace and Eco-Tourism Hub of Southern Philippines", primarily focused on three major key areas of peace, environment and tourism. Maluso is home to Maluso River, locally known as “Subah Maluso”, historically tied with its humble beginnings centuries ago, and a known source of freshwater from European sailors and adventurers of the past.

Geography

Barangays
Maluso is politically subdivided into 20 barangays.

Climate

Demographics

In the 2020 census, Maluso had a population of 45,730.

Economy

Notable people
 

Indanan Kasim Daud, politician and Maluso mayor in Basilan (2010–13)

References

External links
 Maluso Profile at the DTI Cities and Municipalities Competitive Index
 [ Philippine Standard Geographic Code]

Municipalities of Basilan